The Academy for the Arts, Science and Technology (shortened as AAST or The Academy) is a branch school of the Horry County Schools system in Horry County, South Carolina. It has a focus on specific career majors and has qualifying status as a Blue Ribbon School and as a New American High School. However, despite the popularity and successes of the school, by a vote of the Horry County School Board on October 21, 2019, the program was partially dismantled and converted into a two-year program.

References

External links 
 
 https://www.myhorrynews.com/news/board-aast-only-for-juniors-and-seniors-scholars-to-be/article_0b92c5e2-f46b-11e9-b42d-e3b3bce76d10.html

Public high schools in South Carolina
Schools in Horry County, South Carolina